Joseph Patrick Carrol Naish (January 21, 1896 – January 24, 1973) was an American actor. He appeared in over 200 credits during the Golden Age of Hollywood.

Naish received two Oscar nominations for his supporting roles in the films Sahara (1943) and A Medal for Benny (1945), the latter of which also earned him a Golden Globe. He was honored with a star on the Hollywood Walk of Fame in 1960.

Early life
Naish was born January 21, 1896.

Career
Naish's uncredited bit role in What Price Glory? (1926) launched his career in more than 200 films. He was twice nominated for an Academy Award for Best Supporting Actor, the first for his role as Giuseppe in the movie Sahara (1943), in which he delivers the propaganda speech: Mussolini is not so clever like Hitler, he can dress up his Italians only to look like thieves, cheats, murderers, he cannot like Hitler make them feel like that. He cannot like Hitler scrape from their conscience the knowledge right is right and wrong is wrong, or dig holes in their heads to plant his own Ten Commandments- Steal from thy neighbor, Cheat thy neighbor, Kill thy neighbor! But are my eyes blind that I must fall to my knees to worship a maniac who has made of my country a concentration camp, who has made of my people slaves? Must I kiss the hand that beats me, lick the boot that kicks me? NO! The second was for his performance as the title character's Hispanic father in the movie A Medal for Benny (1945). For the latter film, he won the Golden Globe Award for Best Supporting Actor – Motion Picture.

He often played villains from gangsters in numerous Paramount pictures to mad scientists, such as Dr. Daka in the Batman film serial. In the 1940s Naish was a supporting character in a number of horror films. He played Boris Karloff's assistant in House of Frankenstein (1944).

Of Irish descent, he rarely played an Irishman, explaining, "When the part of an Irishman comes along, nobody ever thinks of me." He portrayed numerous other ethnicities including Southern European (especially Italian), Eastern European, Latin American, Native American, Middle Eastern, South Asian, East Asian, Pacific Islander—even African American, which earned him the moniker "Hollywood's one-man U.N."

On radio, Naish starred as Luigi Basco on the popular CBS program Life with Luigi (1948–1953). Luigi popularity resulted in a CBS television series of the same name, with Naish reprising his role.

In 1955, Naish originated the role of Alfieri in the one-act, verse version of Arthur Miller's A View from the Bridge on Broadway, also starring Van Heflin and Eileen Heckart.

In 1957–1958, Naish played the lead role in the television series The New Adventures of Charlie Chan. Speaking in 2023, co-star James Hong said Naish held "a deep prejudice" and in a racist outburst had him fired from the series just because Hong had missed a single line.

In 1971, he appeared in his final film role, Dracula vs. Frankenstein (1971), as a mad scientist; a role descended from the original Dr. Frankenstein takes to murdering young women for experimentation in hopes of reviving his ancestor's creation, with help from his mute assistant, played by Lon Chaney Jr., whose film appearance was also his last.

Personal life
Naish was married (from 1929 until his death) to actress Gladys Heaney; they had one daughter, Elaine.

Death
Naish retired to San Diego and died of emphysema on January 24, 1973, at Scripps Memorial Hospital in nearby La Jolla, California, three days after his 77th birthday. He is interred at Calvary Cemetery in East Los Angeles, California. For his contributions to television, he has a star on the Hollywood Walk of Fame at 6145 Hollywood Boulevard.

Filmography

Radio broadcasts

References

External links

 
 

1896 births
1973 deaths
20th-century American male actors
Male actors from New York City
American male film actors
American people of Irish descent
American male radio actors
American male silent film actors
American male stage actors
American male television actors
American Roman Catholics
Best Supporting Actor Golden Globe (film) winners
Burials at Calvary Cemetery (Los Angeles)
Deaths from emphysema
Vaudeville performers